Gourdon is a commune in the Saône-et-Loire department in the region of Bourgogne-Franche-Comté in eastern France.

The Treasure of Gourdon is a hoard of gold objects buried around the year 524 and unearthed in 1845 in the commune, which date to the end of the fifth or the beginning of the sixth century.

Geography
The Arconce forms part of the commune's southeastern border.

See also
Communes of the Saône-et-Loire department

References

Communes of Saône-et-Loire